Asaphocrita protypica is a moth in the family Blastobasidae. It is found in the United States, including Texas and New Mexico.

References

Moths described in 1931
protypica